"Bye-Bye, Junior High" is the sixteenth episode of the third and final season of Canadian teen drama television series Degrassi Junior High. It originally aired on CBC Television in Canada on February 27, 1989. It was written by Yan Moore and directed by Kit Hood. The episode sees the school's grade nine class approaching graduation, with some students, including Christine "Spike" Nelson (Amanda Stepto) and Derek "Wheels" Wheeler (Neil Hope) becoming uncertain of their academic future as a result of their life situations. At the graduation dance, a faulty boiler causes a fire which burns the school down.

The episode received a positive reception from contemporary critics.

Plot 
As graduation nears, Derek "Wheels" Wheeler (Neil Hope) is uncertain that he will pass the year as a result of the amount of time he has taken off due to his parents' death. Christine "Spike" Nelson (Amanda Stepto), due to the stress of her motherhood with Emma, becomes increasingly pessimistic about her future. During class, the fire alarm goes off, with the grade 9 students being told to leave in an "orderly" fashion. Meanwhile, Joey Jeremiah (Pat Mastroianni) wants to go to the dance with Caitlin Ryan (Stacie Mistysyn), but his mother will only allow it if his grades are above C. However, Joey does not tell this to Caitlin, and she becomes angry at him when he does get a C and he tells her he cannot go to the dance.

Wheels on the other hand is given his marks by Mr. Garcia (Roger Montogomery). Garcia acknowledges the loss of Wheels' parents, and it is revealed that he passed, although barely. Despite the classes he missed, as well as his behavioral record, Garcia felt it was in Wheels' best interest to stay with his peers, despite being normally recommended to repeat his year. Wheels jumps in excitement and leaves.

Meanwhile, Ms. Avery (Michelle Goodeve) visits Spike at her mother's salon to deliver her grades, which are poor. Avery recommends that Spike enroll in correspondence courses, but Spike, disillusioned and pessimistic, balks at the idea of having a future, and blames Emma for her situation. Avery tells Spike to count her blessings and appreciate the fact that she can have a baby.

Joey comes home depressed with his report card. However, even after seeing the C, his mother, proud of two A's that he had received in certain classes, allows him to go to the dance. At the dance, Joey and Caitlin reunite and reconcile, and Spike approaches Ms. Avery for her correspondence forms. Shane McKay (Bill Parrott), who had been absent due to a drug-induced brain injury, also attends the dance, now walking with the aid of a frame. Outside the gymnasium, Scooter Webster (Christopher Charlesworth) and Tessa Campanelli (Kirsten Bourne), two younger students, are running around the school playing tag, when they smell smoke near the boiler room. The two investigate the smoke and then open the door to the boiler room, accidentally causing a massive fire inside to spread. The fire spreads outside and towards several gas tanks. Back in the gymnasium, the fire alarm rings, and the students begin to leave, until they hear a loud explosion, to which they hurriedly evacuate the building watch in horror as the school burns to the ground.

Production 
The school used in the series was the Vincent Massey Junior School building on Daisy Avenue in Etobicoke, Ontario. By the end of the series' production, Linda Schuyler recalled that the four classrooms used in the show were "bursting at the seams", In what Schuyler calls a "bold" move, a decision was made to burn down the fictional school for the series finale. As it was a real location, the scenes of the burning school were created via special effects. According to director Phillip Earnshaw, a photographic plate was shot of the school building, and sent to a special effects company who created a cut-out of the building with open windows and filmed the flames through the windows. The film was then sent back and superimposed onto the shot of the school building, creating the effect of the school being on fire.

Release 
The episode was given an advance screening at the Royal Ontario Museum on January 27, 1989, in a party dubbed "Derniere" by creators Linda Schuyler and Kit Hood. The episode aired on CBC Television at 8:30.p.m on February 27, 1989. In Australia, it aired at 5:30pm on October 10, 1989 on ABC-TV.

Critical reception 
Writing for the Montreal Gazette, Janice Kennedy praised the episode, calling it "artful, tightly scripted, [and] entertaining", but noted that a "colossally poor bit of directing and/or editing" made character Joey Jeremiah look missing during the scene of the school burning down, appearing to end the series on a "Who shot J.R.?"-style cliffhanger. Toronto Star's Greg Quill made a similar comparison to the "Who shot J.R.?" cliffhanger. He also added that while the episode had a "doubly bitter taste of finality", it nonetheless was one of the "most sincere and heartwarming" episodes of the series, as it showcased how both the cast and crew had matured over time.

Home media 
The episode was released on DVD as part of the Degrassi Junior High: Season 3 DVD box set.by WGBH Boston on September 27, 2005.

References

Works cited
 

1989 Canadian television episodes
Degrassi Junior High episodes
Television series finales